Gülpınar is a town (belde) and municipality in the Gülağaç District, Aksaray Province, Turkey. Its population is 2,807 (2021).

References

Populated places in Aksaray Province
Towns in Turkey
Gülağaç District